Heuaktion (German: "hay harvest", or "hay operation") was a World War II Nazi German operation in which 40,000 to 50,000 Polish children aged 10 to 14 were kidnapped by German occupation forces and transported to Germany as slave labourers.

"Heuaktion" was an acronym for "Homeless, parentless, unhoused [heimatlos, elternlos, unterkunftslos – HEU, "hay"] Operation". On arrival in Germany, the children were turned over to Organisation Todt and to the Junkers aircraft works.

The intention of the mass abductions was to pressure the adult populations of the occupied territories to register as workers in the Reich, and to weaken the “biological strength” of the areas which Germany had invaded.

Background
Alfred Rosenberg, head of the Reich Ministry for the Occupied Eastern Territories, originally feared that targeting children aged 10 to 14 would be seen as simple abduction, and proposed instead kidnapping older children aged 15 to 17. However, actions of the German 9th Army induced him to consent to the kidnapping of younger children.

The children were transferred to special camps for children called Kindererziehungslager, where the Germans selected children whose racial traits made them suitable for Germanization. Children considered racially unsuitable were sent either to forced labour or to concentration camps, including Auschwitz, after the destruction of their birth certificates.

The children were kidnapped by Army Group Centre and by the 2nd Army, whose Chief of Staff, Henning von Tresckow, on 28 June 1944 signed the order to abduct the children.

The operation peaked in 1944, but the kidnappings were not fully implemented due to the subsequent course of the war.

Post war
The Nuremberg trials classified the kidnapping of children as part of the Nazi program of systemic genocide.

See also
Forced labour under German rule during World War II
Generalplan Ost
Germanisation
Kidnapping of children by Nazi Germany
Untermensch
Genocide

References

Child abduction in Germany
Germany–Poland relations
Nazi war crimes in Poland
Anti-Polish sentiment